Lindani Nkosi (born 5 March 1968) is a South African actor.  He is known for portraying Lincoln Sibeko in the soap opera Isidingo.  He also portrayed Nelson Mandela in the 2004 film Drum.

Select filmography
Drum (2004)
A Small Town Called Descent (2010)
Of Good Report (2013)

References

External links
 

21st-century South African male actors
South African male film actors
South African male television actors
Living people
1968 births